Milton is an unincorporated community in Albemarle County, Virginia.
In the batteaux era Milton was the head of navigation along the river, but by the mid-nineteenth century horse-drawn canal boats were traveling all the way upstream to Charlottesville, where the head of navigation was located at the very point where the Fredericksburg Road (now VA 20) and Three Chopt Road (U.S. Route 250).

Notable people
 Lizzie Petit Cutler (1831-1902), writer

References

Unincorporated communities in Virginia
Unincorporated communities in Albemarle County, Virginia